Gordon Savage may refer to:

 Gordon Savage (ice hockey) (1906–1974), ice hockey player
 Gordon Savage (bishop) (1915–1990), Anglican bishop